Plectanocotylidae is a family of polyopisthocotylean monogeneans. All the species in this family are parasitic on the gills of marine fish.

Genera
According to the World Register of Marine Species,  the family includes these genera:

 Adenicola Mamaev & Parukhin, 1972 
 Euzetplectanocotyle Mamaev & Tkachuk, 1979 
 Inversocotyle Mamaev & Parukhin, 1972 
 Octoplectanocotyla Yamaguti, 1937 
 Peristedionelia Mamaev & Parukhin, 1972 
 Plectanocotyle Diesing, 1850 including Plectanocotyle gurnardi, Plectanocotyle major  and Plectanocotyle lastovizae
 Plectanocotyloides Euzet & Suriano, 1974  
 Triglicola Mamaev & Parukhin, 1972 
 Triglicoloides Mamaev & Parukhin, 1972

References

Polyopisthocotylea
Platyhelminthes families
Parasites of fish